Nathan P. "Nate" Cote (born December 4, 1946) is a former member of the New Mexico House of Representatives who represented the 53rd District from 2007 to 2011, and again from 2013 to 2015.

Notes

External links
 Representative Nathan P. Cote at the NM House website
 Project Vote Smart – Representative Nathan P. Cote (NM) profile
 Follow the Money – Nathan P. Cote
 2006 campaign contributions

1946 births
Living people
Democratic Party members of the New Mexico House of Representatives
United States Navy sailors